Katherine Nicole Pruitt (born March 4, 1994) is an American singer-songwriter based in Nashville, Tennessee. Her debut album, Expectations, was released in 2020 by Rounder Records.

Early life and education 
Pruitt grew up in the suburbs of Atlanta, Georgia. She was raised in a Catholic family and attended Catholic school. She began singing as a child in musical theatre productions. She began learning guitar in middle school with her mother teaching her basic chords and hymns. Pruitt continued singing at open mic nights in Athens, Georgia while attending community college.

She attended Belmont University in Nashville, Tennessee, where she joined a band and received the first annual Nashville Songwriting Scholarship from the BMI Foundation.

Career 
In 2017, Pruitt was awarded the Buddy Holly Prize from the Songwriters Hall of Fame and signed with Round Hill Records.

Her EP, OurVinyl Live Session EP was released in March 2018. She was named by Rolling Stone as one of 10 new country artists you need to know and by NPR as one of the 20 artists to watch, highlighting Pruitt as someone who "possesses a soaring, nuanced and expressive voice, and writes with devastating honesty".

On September 13, 2019, Pruitt released "Expectations", the title track from her full-length debut. Additional singles from this project were subsequently released: "Loving Her" on October 21, 2019, and "Out of the Blue" on November 15, 2019.

On February 21, 2020, Pruitt's debut album, Expectations, was released by Rounder Records. She earned a nomination for Emerging Act of the Year at the 2020 Americana Music Honors & Awards. In the same year, she duetted with Canadian singer-songwriter Donovan Woods on "She Waits for Me to Come Back Down", a track from his album Without People.

In 2021 the artist was inter alia part of the Newport Folk Festival in July.

On March 18, 2022, Pruitt recorded an episode of The Caverns Sessions (previously known as Bluegrass Underground), which aired nationally on PBS on October 15, 2022.

Artistry 
With roots in folk music, Pruitt attributes growing up in the south of the United States as a key influence on her songwriting, both stylistically and thematically.

Her music often deals with complex coming-of-age issues such as mental health, navigating toxic relationships, and questioning religious faith. She describes the tension between coming out as a lesbian and growing up in a conservative household while attending Catholic school as the catalyst for using her music as a platform to speak openly and honestly about issues faced by LGBTQ youth. She has said in interviews that she hopes her music makes young people struggling with their sexuality feel less alone.

Pruitt cites Brandi Carlile as an inspiration for her music.

Discography

Studio albums
 Expectations (2020)

Singles

Awards and nominations

References

External links 
 

1994 births
Living people
Belmont University alumni
Americana musicians
American women country singers
American alternative rock musicians
American alternative country singers
American pop rock singers
American folk-pop singers
American women pop singers
American folk rock musicians
21st-century American women singers
American country singer-songwriters
American women singer-songwriters
Singers from Nashville, Tennessee
Musicians from Atlanta
American lesbian musicians
American LGBT singers
LGBT people from Georgia (U.S. state)
LGBT people from Tennessee
21st-century American guitarists
Rounder Records artists
21st-century American singers
21st-century American women guitarists
20th-century LGBT people
21st-century LGBT people
Singer-songwriters from Tennessee
Singer-songwriters from Georgia (U.S. state)